Reacher is an American action crime streaming television series developed by Nick Santora for Amazon Prime Video. Based on the Jack Reacher book series by Lee Child, it stars Alan Ritchson as the title character, a drifter and former military policeman who battles dangerous criminals throughout his travels.

The first season, based on Killing Floor, Child's 1997 debut novel, was released on February 4, 2022. A second season has been ordered, and will be based on Bad Luck and Trouble.

Premise
Jack Reacher is a former U.S. Army military policeman. While visiting the (fictional) rural town of Margrave, Georgia, he is arrested for murder. After he is freed, he teams up with Oscar Finlay and Roscoe Conklin to investigate a wide conspiracy with corrupt police officers, politicians and businessmen.

Cast and characters
 Alan Ritchson as Jack Reacher
 Willa Fitzgerald as Roscoe Conklin, Margrave PD
 Malcolm Goodwin as Oscar Finlay, Margrave PD Police Captain and Chief Detective 
 Maria Sten as Frances Neagley
 Bruce McGill as Mayor Grover Teale and subsequently Police Chief
 Lara Jean Chorostecki as Molly Beth Gordon, a Secret Service agent who was involved with Joe Reacher
 Harvey Guillén as Jasper, Margrave's medical examiner
 Martin Roach as Picard, an FBI agent and old friend of Finlay's
 Currie Graham as Kliner Sr., the owner of Kliner Industries
 Chris Webster as Kliner Jr., Kliner Sr.'s son
 Marc Bendavid as Paul Hubble, a banker strong-armed into assisting a counterfeiting ring
 Kristin Kreuk as Charlene "Charlie" Hubble, Paul's wife
 Willie C. Carpenter as Mosley, an elderly barber and longtime resident of Margrave

Episodes

Production

Development 
On July 15, 2019, a TV series adaptation of Lee Child's Jack Reacher series was announced by Amazon. Nick Santora, who created Scorpion, was set to write, showrun, and produce the series through Paramount Television and Skydance Media. On January 14, 2020, the TV series was greenlit, with Don Granger, Scott Sullivan, David Ellison, Dana Goldberg, Marcy Ross, and Christopher McQuarrie as executive producers with Child. The first season was announced as an adaptation of Child's novel Killing Floor. In July 2021, it was announced M. J. Bassett had joined the series as a director. Adapting the books to screen the writers decided they would need to make Reacher verbalize his thoughts more often, but that they would keep his dialog short and direct and have him only speak longer to people he respects. They also decided to introduce Neagley to the series far earlier than in the books.

Casting
On September 4, 2020, Alan Ritchson was cast in the titular role. On March 22, 2021, Malcolm Goodwin, Willa Fitzgerald, and  Chris Webster were cast as series regulars. On May 19, 2021, Bruce McGill, Maria Sten, and Hugh Thompson joined the main cast. On June 11, 2021, Kristin Kreuk, Marc Bendavid, Willie C. Carpenter, Currie Graham, Harvey Guillén, and Maxwell Jenkins were announced to have joined the cast in undisclosed capacities.

Filming 
A temporary townscape was built in North Pickering, Ontario to support filming of the show. The entire fictional city of Margrave was built from the ground up in a leased farm field in Ontario. Other areas of filming include Toronto, Port Perry and Pickering. Principal shooting of season 1 took place between April 15 and July 30, 2021, in Toronto. During filming, Ritchson broke a bone in his shoulder which required surgery and tore an abdominal muscle during a fight scene.

Release
The series was released on February 4, 2022. On February 7, 2022, Amazon Prime Video renewed the series for a second season.

Reception

Audience viewership 
Reacher was the most streamed television series for the week of February 7–13, 2022, according to the Nielsen streaming rankings – the first Amazon production to achieve the feat.

Critical response 
The review aggregator website Rotten Tomatoes reported a 92% approval rating with an average rating of 7.30/10, based on 73 critic reviews. The website's critics consensus reads, "Reacher captures the trademark bulk of its titular hero while trading away some of his definition, but fans of the novels will find plenty to love about this faithful adaptation." Metacritic, which uses a weighted average, assigned a score of 68 out of 100 based on 18 critics, indicating "generally favorable reviews".

Lucy Mangan of The Guardian said, "This rollicking adaptation of Lee Child's man-mountain ex-military sleuth is hugely fun, packed with punchups and far better than Cruise's movie efforts." Michael Hogan of The Telegraph wrote, "Reacher is huge, pulpy fun and far classier than you might expect." Joshua Alston of Variety wrote a nuanced critique that, although positive about the casting of Ritchson, criticizes the fundamentals of the character as being unsuitable to carry this kind of show. He opined that "the longer it runs, the more obvious its protagonist-shaped void becomes". Dan Fienberg of The Hollywood Reporter called it "frustratingly over-faithful to the source material", saying, "I wouldn't mind another season, but I'd probably still rather read another book."

References

External links
 

2022 American television series debuts
2020s American crime drama television series
American action television series
American thriller television series
English-language television shows
Amazon Prime Video original programming
Jack Reacher
Patricide in fiction
Television shows based on British novels
Television series by Amazon Studios
Television series by Paramount Television
Television series by Skydance Television